Visible from Space is an American band based in New York City that was formed in 2002. Its members include lead singer, songwriter, and American Idol Season 4 semi-finalist Judd Harris; guitarist and songwriter Rick Nossa; bassist Jon Price; drummer Paul Amorese; and keyboardist Jon Loyd. Their sound is considered to run a gamut of funk/rock/blues with a heavy New Orleans, Louisiana (Harris' hometown) influence, earning them favorable comparisons to bands such as The Black Keys, Red Hot Chili Peppers, Lenny Kravitz, Maroon 5, Led Zeppelin and The Black Crowes from various critics and reviewers.

The band was featured in the Best of 2005 issue of The Village Voice as well as in Rolling Stone for their debut album Fly, and two of their songs won coveted "Track of the Year" awards in June 2006 at the respected independent music website GarageBand.com. They have been involved in philanthropic work, opening for Wyclef Jean and other artists at the musical fundraiser "Do You Know What It Means To Miss New Orleans?", which was organized by Harris and hosted by actress Susan Sarandon. The benefit concert, held in October 2005, raised almost $20,000 for victims of Hurricane Katrina, as well as musical instruments for musicians who had lost theirs in the hurricane.

The group had its genesis when guitarist Nossa placed an ad on craigslist for a singer. Harris responded to the ad and auditioned for Nossa by singing an impromptu version of "The Thrill is Gone"  by B.B. King in a rented rehearsal space. There were other band names and other members over the years, but eventually the name Visible from Space was chosen, taken from the New Orleans teaching that the Louisiana Superdome sports stadium is indeed visible from outer space (it is not, as Harris discovered once he was past childhood).  Visible from Space currently plays at numerous New York City venues and their debut album Fly was released in July 2006. Dreams followed in September 2012.

Discography 
Fly July 7, 2006
Track Listing
 Back to the City
 Keep It Inside
 I Wish the World
 Credentials
 Let It Go
 Burn Bright
 We All Want to Believe
 You're Gonna Make It
 If You Axe Me
 Searchin
 Room to Breathe
 I Had My Music
 Keep It Inside (Reprise)

Dreams September 16, 2012
Track Listing
 Dreams
 It's Only Natural
 Brother My Brother
 Whiskey
 To Reach You
 Four Letter Word
 Long Day
 Sweet Sixteen
 Gallatin Street
 Ain't No Woman
 Jump Back Cadillac

Music videos
"If You Axe Me" (2012)
"Four Letter Word" (2012)
"Dreams Promo" (2011)

Television appearances
Fox 8 Morning Show WVUE New Orleans (May 1, 2013) : Performed "If You Axe Me", "Long Day", "Gallatin Street", "We All Wanna Believe"

References

External links
The official Visible From Space Reverbnation page featuring video clips, samples, news and more
Visible from Space website
Visible from Space on myspace.com with music samples
Visible from Space on GarageBand.com
Review of Fly, song clips, and all-profits-to-the-band ordering on earBuzz.com
'American Idol' alum Judd Harris shoots a video tribute to his hometown
Best Funkin' American Idol Reject New York - 2005 JUDD HARRIS

Indie rock musical groups from New York (state)
Musical groups from New York City
American funk musical groups
American blues musical groups